Christopher Aaron Wyatt, sometimes credited as Chris "Doc" Wyatt, (born October 5, 1975 in Atlanta, Georgia) is an American film producer, writer, and second unit director. He produced the 2004 film Napoleon Dynamite, the 2006 film Think Tank, the 2007 film Beneath, the 2007 film Coyote, and the 2009 film Broken Hill featuring Oscar-winner Timothy Hutton. He is a graduate of the Peter Stark Producing Program at the University of Southern California.

In 2005, Wyatt was nominated for an Independent Spirit Award and shared the nomination for Best First Feature with Jared Hess (director), Jeremy Coon (producer), and Sean Covel (producer). Napoleon Dynamite lost to Garden State (2004). Additionally that year, Wyatt was nominated with Sean Covel for the Producers Award at the Independent Spirit Awards.

Wyatt next produced Cafe (2010) starring Jennifer Love Hewitt and Murder in the Dark (2013), which he also co-wrote. Wyatt, together with writing partner Kevin Burke, has written episodes of many animated TV shows, starting with Iron Man: Armored Adventures and Avengers: Earth's Mightiest Heroes. He has also co-written episodes for Avengers Assemble and Ultimate Spider-Man. Again alongside Kevin Burke, he was also a regular writer for Teenage Mutant Ninja Turtles, wrote four episodes for My Little Pony: Friendship Is Magic titled "The Times They Are a Changeling", "Viva Las Pegasus", “P.P.O.V. (Pony Point of View)”, and "Friendship University", and teamed up with Burke on Stretch Armstrong and the Flex Fighters for Netflix as developers (alongside Victor Cook), executive producers, writers and story editors. The duo also held the same roles on the Spin Master Entertainment adaptation of Super Dinosaur. Wyatt and Burke are Executive Producers on Transformers: Rescue Bots Academy.

Screenwriting credits
 series head writer denoted in bold

Television
 Iron Man: Armored Adventures (2009-2012)
 The Avengers: Earth's Mightiest Heroes (2010-2012)
 Gormiti Nature Unleashed (2012)
 Avengers Assemble (2013-2015)
 Teenage Mutant Ninja Turtles (2013-2017)
 Monsuno (2014)
 Transformers: Rescue Bots (2014-2016)
 The Octonauts (2015-2016)
 Ben 10 (2016)
 Ultimate Spider-Man (2016-2017)
 My Little Pony: Friendship is Magic (2016-2018)
 Mystic Cosmic Patrol (2017)
 Guardians of the Galaxy (2017)
 Sonic Boom (2017)
 Rocket %26 Groot (2017)
 Stretch Armstrong and the Flex Fighters (2017-2018)
 Spider-Man (2017–2020)
 Bravest Warriors (2018)
 Transformers: Cyberverse (2018)
 Star Wars: Resistance (2018-2019)
 Super Dinosaur (2018-2019)
 Legend Quest: Masters of Myth (2019)
 Sunny Day (2019)
 Ninjago (2019–2022)
 Thunderbirds Are Go (2020)
 Chico Bon Bon: Monkey with a Tool Belt (2020)
 Snap Ships: Dawn of Battle (2020)
 Transformers: Rescue Bots Academy (2020-2021)
 Transformers: BotBots (2022-present)

Film
 Concrete Blondes (2013)
 Murder in the Dark (2013)
 Batman Unlimited: Mechs vs. Mutants (2016)

Web shorts
 Batman Unlimited (2016)
 CryptoForce Alpha (2017)
 Ninjago: Reimagined (2021)
 The Virtues of Spinjitzu (2022)

Producer

Television
 Napoleon Dynamite (2012)
 Avengers Assemble (2014-2015)
 Ultimate Spider-Man (2016-2017)
 Mystic Cosmic Patrol (2017)
 Stretch Armstrong and the Flex Fighters (2017-2018)
 Spider-Man (2017-2020)
 Super Dinosaur (2018-2019)
 Transformers: Rescue Bots Academy (2019-2021)
 Ninjago (2020–present)
 Transformers: BotBots (2022-present)

Film
 Napoleon Dynamite (2004)
 Think Tank (2006)
 Beneath (2007)
 Coyote (2007)
 Café (2010)
 The Citizen (2013)
 Murder in the Dark (2013)
 Eleven Eleven (2018)

References

External links

1975 births
Living people
American film producers
Male actors from Atlanta
American male film actors
21st-century American male actors
Writers from Atlanta
Screenwriters from Georgia (U.S. state)
21st-century American screenwriters